Mediorhynchus mattei is a species of acanthocephalan, a parasitic worm, found in the digestive tract of a bird, the northern red-billed hornbill Tockus erythrorhynchus. Male worms are 2-3 cm in length, females are 3-11 cm in length. It was described in 1982; its name honours French zoologist Xavier Mattei.

Hosts and localities

The northern red-billed hornbill Tockus erythrorhynchus is the type-host of Mediorhynchus mattei. The parasite was described from specimens found in Senegal.

References

Archiacanthocephala
Animals described in 1982
Fauna of Senegal
Parasites of birds